Le Jacques Cartier is the sixth ship of the  of cruise ships operated by Ponant.  Each member of the class has been allocated the name of a famous French explorer. Initially, the sixth ship in the class was named Le Surville, after Jean-François-Marie de Surville, a French trader and navigator. However, before entering service she was renamed Le Jacques Cartier, after Jacques Cartier, a French-Breton explorer.

Ponant's order for Le Surville (as she was then named) and a sister ship, the fifth of the class, was announced in March 2018. The hull of each ship was constructed by VARD in the builder's Tulcea yard in Romania; the steel cutting ceremony for both ships took place on 4 April 2018. Upon completion, the hulls were transferred to the builder's Søviknes facility in Ålesund, Norway, for final outfitting.

Following her renaming, Le Jacques Cartier was delivered to Ponant on 10 July 2020.

References

External links

 Compagnie du Ponant official site page about the ship

2020 ships
Ships built in Norway
Ships built in Romania
Ships of Compagnie du Ponant